The Somerville Historic District is a  historic district in Somerville, Tennessee which was listed on the National Register of Historic Places in 1982.

It included 75 contributing buildings, including the Fayette County Courthouse.

References

County courthouses in Tennessee
Historic districts on the National Register of Historic Places in Tennessee
National Register of Historic Places in Fayette County, Tennessee
Greek Revival architecture in Tennessee
Victorian architecture in Tennessee